Francišak Kušal, also Frantsishak Kushal, Franz Kushel (February 16, 1895, Piaršai, Russian Empire - May 1969, Rochester, New York, United States) was a Belarusian and Polish militaryman and politician.

Biography
Kušal was born into a family of Roman Catholic Belarusian near Valozhyn.

After the outbreak of World War I, Kušal was drafted into the Russian army. He graduated from an infantry military school in Vilnia in 1916 and was sent to the Western Front.

After the October Revolution he joined the Belarusian national movement that demanded the establishment of an independent or autonomous Belarusian republic. In 1919, he was arrested by Polish authorities for Belarusian pro-independence activism.

In 1919-1921 Kušal was Deputy Head of the Belarusian Military Commission, a body organising Belarusian national military units within the Polish army. After the Polish-Bolshevik War, he joined the Polish army and graduated from an officer school in 1922. During the 1920s and 1930s he was director and lecturer at various military schools. He has been promoted to Captain and awarded the Silver Cross of Merit.

After the Soviet attack on Poland, in 1939, Kušal was commander of a Polish battalion that fought the German army near Lviv. He was imprisoned and placed in a concentration camp near Starobilsk and then in Butyrka prison in Moscow. In early 1941 he was set free and sent to Bielastok, then part of the Belarusian Soviet Socialist Republic.

After the German invasion of the USSR, Kušal worked as director of a training school for the Belarusian Auxiliary Police, then worked at various leading positions of the local Belarusian self-defence and police units and organising training for Belarusian officers. In 1943, Kušal became member of the Belarusian Central Rada, responsible for military issues. Since March 1944, he was head of the Belarusian Home Defence (BKA) - a 25 thousand to 50 thousand men strong Belarusian army, for the creation of which the Belarusians have received German approval at the final stage of the war.

After the withdrawal of Germans from Belarus, Kušal and his units left the country too. The Belarusian units were reorganized into units of the Waffen SS. In April 1945, Kušal and his units surrendered to the Americans in Bavaria. He led the Displaced Persons-Camp in Michelsdorf in Cham. Later Kušal lived in Munich.

As a Polish citizen before 1939, Kušal was not handed over to the Soviets after end of war in 1945. In 1950, Kušal emigrated to the US. In exile, he was an active member of the Belarusian American community and Belarusian political organisations. From 1952 to 1954 he was the leader of the Belarusan-American Association.

Family

Kušal's wife, Natallia Arsiennieva, of Russian descent, was a notable Belarusian poet and member of the Belarusian national movement.

His younger son, Jarasłaŭ, was killed by a bomb planted by Soviet partisans in a theatre in the German-occupied Minsk.

References

1895 births
1969 deaths
People from Valozhyn District
People from Minsky Uyezd
Members of the Belarusian Central Council
Belarusian generals
Russian military personnel of World War I
Belarusian people of World War I
Polish military personnel of World War II
Byelorussian Home Defence personnel
Polish people of Belarusian descent
Polish emigrants to the United States
 People from Rochester, New York